The people listed below were all born in, residents of, worked in, adopted in or otherwise are closely associated with the city of Prayagraj, Uttar Pradesh and its surrounding suburbs.

List
People listed in bold were born in Allahabad.

Academics, science, and engineering
Manindra Agrawal – mathematician, engineer, recipient of Padmashree, Infosys Prize and Fulkerson Prize
Ziauddin Ahmad – mathematician
Amiya Charan Banerjee – mathematician
John B. Chitamber – educational reformer
Sorab K. Ghandhi – educational reformer
Rajesh Gopakumar – theoretical physicist at HRI; SSB Prize winner 
Raj Narain Kapoor – educational reformer
Ravindra Khattree – statistician, author
Chittaranjan Mitra – scientist
Henri Pequet – pilot of the official airmail flight
Zahoor Qasim – marine biologist
Amitava Raychaudhuri – theoretical particle physicist at HRI; SSB Prize winner
Ashoke Sen – string theorist, Fellow of the Royal Society, Milner Prize winner, theoretical physicist at HRI

Authors and writers
Suryakant Tripathi Nirala – Hindi littérateur
Meena Alexander –  poet
Akbar Allahabadi –  poet
Harivansh Rai Bachchan – poet, writer, born in and resident of Allahabad
Aniruddha Bahal –  journalist, novelist
Dharamvir Bharati –  author, poet
Krishna Prakash Bahadur –  writer
Satish Chandra –  writer, historian
Subhadra Kumari Chauhan –  poet
Shamsur Rahman Faruqi – poet
Harisena –  poet
Rafiq Husain – writer, poet
Arvind Krishna Mehrotra – poet, anthologist and resident of Allahabad
Sumitranandan Pant – writer, poet
Vibhuti Narain Rai –  novelist
Ibn-e-Safi – novelist
Allan Sealy – author, writer, recipient of Commonwealth Writers' Prize
Julia Strachey – novelist, writer
Vikas Swarup – novelist, diplomat
Mahadevi Varma –  poet
Dhirendra Verma – critic
Amarkant – writer
Leema Dhar -Novelist/Poet/ Motivational Speaker

Business and philanthropy 
Abhay Bhushan –  Computer engineer
Amol Bose – "Grandfather of Indian advertising"
Sarala Devi Chaudhurani –  founder of Bharat Stree Mahamandal
Jagmal Raja Chauhan –  contractor, industrialist and philanthropist
Imtiaz Alam Hanfi –  banker, governor of the State Bank of Pakistan
Sam Higginbottom – philanthropist, founder of Sam Higginbottom Institute of Agriculture, Technology and Sciences
Neeraj Roy –  managing director and CEO Hungama
Mason Vaugh –  philanthropist, educational reformer

Fine arts
Mallika Chabba –  painter
Hariprasad Chaurasia –  musician
Ram Chandra Shukla –  painter
Shubha Mudgal –  musician

Media
Amitabh Bachchan  –  film actor, recipient of Padma Vibhushan, Knight of the Legion of Honour and resident of Allahabad
Vijay Bose  –  theatre director and actor
Sulochana Brahaspati  –  singer
Hariprasad Chaurasia  –  composer, flutist
 Rakesh Chaurasia  –  flautist
Tigmanshu Dhulia – director, producer, recipient of National Film Award
Tanveer Zaidi – film actor, educationist, television presenter
Aditya Srivastava – actor 
Deepraj Rana - actor
Vikrant Chaturvedi  –  voice artist
Nikhil Dwivedi  –  actor
Jaddanbai  –  singer, actress
Nidhi Singh - Actress
Nalin Mazumdar  –  guitarist
Prachi Mishra  –  former Femina Miss India Earth
Indrani Mukherjee  –  actress
Nargis  –  actress
Kinsey Peile  –  playwright, actor
Siddharth Nigam – actor
Mudit Nayar – actor
Pawan Shankar – actor, entrepreneur
Faisal Malik- actor

Military
Girish Bihari – IPS officer
Norman Anil Kumar Browne – former Chief of Air Staff of the Indian Air Force; India's ambassador to Norway; born in Allahabad
George Nicolas Channer – recipient of the Victoria Cross
Syed Ata Hasnain – Lieutenant General in the Indian Army
Bhopinder Singh – Lieutenant Governor of the Andaman and Nicobar Islands

Music
Bholanath Prasanna - classical flautist
Hariprasad Chaurasia – classical flautist
Sahana Devi – singer, resident of Allahabad
Shubha Mudgal – classical

Nobel laureates
Rudyard Kipling – author, assistant editor at The Pioneer (Allahabad), Nobel Prize in Literature (1907)

Politics and law

Head of state and government
Indira Gandhi - 3rd Prime Minister of India; born in and resident of Allahabad
Jawaharlal Nehru - 1st Prime Minister of India
Chandra Shekhar - 8th Prime Minister of India
Vishwanath Pratap Singh - 7th Prime Minister of India
Keshari Nath Tripathi - Governor of West Bengal, Governor of Bihar, Governor of Mizoram and lawyer at Allahabad High Court
Keshav Prasad Maurya - Deputy Chief Minister of Uttar Pradesh, BJP Significant Campaigner, Former Member of Lok Sabha / Parliament and ex State President of Bharatiya Janata Party

Others
Atique Ahmed – Indian politician, criminal and history sheeter 
Asaf Ali – Governor of Odisha
Hemvati Nandan Bahuguna -Former Chief Minister of Uttar Pradesh, Minister of Finance
Rita Bahuguna – Member of Parliament Allahabad
Vijay Bahuguna – Chief Minister of Uttarakhand
Rajendra Kumari Bajpai – Lieutenant Governor of Pondicherry, Union Minister of India
Shanti Bhushan – 5th Law Minister of India
B. K. Chaturvedi – cabinet secretary of India, recipient of Padma Bhushan
Alvin Robert Cornelius – 4th Chief Justice of Pakistan
John Edge – Chief Justice of High Court of Judicature of the North-Western Provinces
Mohammed Fazal – Governor of Maharashtra
Feroze Gandhi – politician, journalist
Terence Gavaghan – colonial administrator
A. N. D. Haksar – diplomat
Saligram Jaiswal – freedom fighter; former Health Minister, U.P. 
Murli Manohar Joshi – 1st Minister of Human Resource Development, former Ministry of Science and Technology of India
V. N. Khare – 33rd Chief Justice of India
Madan Mohan Malaviya – Bharat Ratna, 25th, 34th and 50th President of the Indian National Congress
Masuriya Din Pasi, Former Member Of Indian Parliament
Janeshwar Mishra – politician
Mukhtar Abbas Naqvi – Vice President of the BJP
Kamala Nehru – freedom fighter, First Lady of the Indian National Congress
Motilal Nehru – 36th and 47th President of the Indian National Congress
Bishambhar Nath Pande – former mayor of Allahabad
Vijaya Lakshmi Pandit – politician,  recipient of Bharat Ratna
Gopal Swarup Pathak – 4th Vice President of India, 4th Governor of Karnataka
Ferdino Rebello – 42nd Chief Justice of Allahabad High Court
Girish Chandra Saxena – former Governor of Jammu and Kashmir
Krishna Mohan Seth – former Governor of Chhattisgarh, Madhya Pradesh and Tripura
Anshuman Singh – former Governor of Rajasthan and Gujarat, former Chief Justice of Rajasthan High Court
Cornelia Sorabji – first woman advocate of India when admitted to Allahabad High Court
Purushottam Das Tandon – lawyer, freedom fighter
Kailas Nath Wanchoo – 10th Chief Justice of India
Baba Ram Adhar Yadav – freedom fighter, ex-MLA, social activist

Religion
Ismail Qureshi al Hashmi – religious scholar
Muhibullah Allahabadi -Sufi scholar
Samuel H. Kellogg – Presbyterian missionary who played a major role in revising and retranslating the Hindi Bible; teacher at Allahabad Bible Seminary
Kripalu Maharaj – spiritual leader
Ramananda – reviver of the Ramanandi sect
John Banerjee – Assistant bishop of Lahore for the Church of England

Royal and noble ranks
Khusrau Mirza – Prince of the Mughal Empire
Mirza Nali – Prince of the Mughal Empire

Sports
Ali Murtaza – first-class cricketer 
Hyder Ali – first-class professional bowler
Dhyan Chand – Olympic gold medalist
Nikhil Chopra – first-class professional bowler
Suresh Goel – badminton champion
Sunil Gulati - president of the United States Soccer Federation; born in Allahabad
Abhinn Shyam Gupta – Olympic badminton player
Mohammad Kaif – first-class batsman in Indian Cricket Team
Ashish Kumar – holder of silver and bronze Commonwealth Games medals
Vivek Mishra – gymnast of Asian and Commonwealth games
Danish Mujtaba – Olympic player
Shalabh Srivastava – first-class professional bowler
Jyoti Yadav – first-class batsman in UP Cricket Team
Ashish Zaidi – first-class professional bowler
Obaid Kamal – first-class professional bowler

See also
 List of University of Allahabad alumni
 Allahabad

References

People

Allahabad
Allahabad